Pyotr Dementyev can refer to the following people:

 Peter Demens (1850–1919), Russian-born American businessman
 Pyotr Dementyev (footballer) (1913—1998), Soviet footballer